Tromsdalen is an urban neighborhood in the city of Tromsø which is in Tromsø Municipality in Troms og Finnmark county, Norway. It is located just to the east of the city centre on the mainland along the coast of the Tromsøysundet strait.

The urban area encompasses a good portion of the valley in which it is located.  Tromsdalen, which literally means Troms valley, is connected to the island of Tromsøya by the Tromsø Bridge. The European route E8 highway runs through the northern part of Tromsdalen. The Tromsdalselva river flows through the valley.  The Arctic Cathedral is located here.

Popular attractions in Tromsdalen are the Arctic Cathedral and the Fjellheisen aerial tramway to the top of a nearby fell; the tramway ends at an elevation of  where the view is stunning. The climb to the top of this mountain is very popular with the Tromsø residents, since mountain climbing equipment is not needed.

References

Villages in Troms og Finnmark
Tromsø
Populated places of Arctic Norway
Valleys of Troms og Finnmark